Go West, Young Man is a 1918 American silent comedy Western film directed by Harry Beaumont and starring Tom Moore, Ora Carew and Melbourne MacDowell.

Cast
 Tom Moore as Dick Latham
 Ora Carew as Rosa Crimmins
 Melbourne MacDowell as Amos Latham
 Jack Richardson as Hugh Godson
 Mollie McConnell as Mrs Latham
 Edward Coxen as Dandy Jim
 James Robert Chandler as Crimmins 
 Hector V. Sarno as Joe

References

External links
 

1918 films
1918 Western (genre) films
1918 comedy films
1910s English-language films
Silent American comedy films
American black-and-white films
Films directed by Harry Beaumont
Goldwyn Pictures films
Silent American Western (genre) films
1910s Western (genre) comedy films
1910s American films